The California Trail is a 1933 American pre-Code
Western film directed by Lambert Hillyer starring Buck Jones, Helen Mack and Luis Alberni.

Cast
 Buck Jones as Santa Fe Stewart (as Charles 'Buck' Jones)
 Helen Mack as Dolores Ramirez
 Luis Alberni as Commandant Emilio Quierra
 George Humbert as Mayor Alberto Piedra (as George Humbart)
 Charles Stevens as Juan
 Carlos Villarías as Governor Carlos Moreno (as Carlos Villar)
 Chris-Pin Martin as Pancho (as Chrispin Martin)
 Carmen Laroux as Juan's wife (as Carmen La Roux)
 William Steele as Pedro (as Robert Steele)
 Al Ernest Garcia as Sergeant Florez (as Allan Garcia)
 Émile Chautard as Don Marco Ramirez (as Emile Chautard)

External links
 
 
 
 

1933 films
American Western (genre) films
Columbia Pictures films
1933 Western (genre) films
Films directed by Lambert Hillyer
1930s English-language films
1930s American films